Cumayanı refers to several places in Turkey:

 Cumayanı, Amasra
 Cumayanı, Karabük
 Cumayanı, Köşk